Való Világ is a reality game show franchise developed by Magyar RTL Televízió, the Hungarian branch of RTL Group to compete with Big Brother. The first season of Való Világ launched on 11 September 2002, and has been followed by seven more seasons, as well as a Czech and a Slovakian incarnation from 2005, both titled VyVolení.

In 2015, Magyar RTL Televízió purchased the rights to produce the Hungarian version of Big Brother and announced to merge the two formats under the name Való Világ powered by Big Brother.

Versions
Through 11 December 2016, Való Világ has produced 14 winners in three franchises. The most recent winner is Vivien Szilágyi from Hungary.

 Currently airing
 An upcoming season
 No longer airing

References

2002 Hungarian television series debuts
Television franchises